Princess Helen Rajya Lakshmi Devi Shah of Nepal (September 21, 1932 – September 12, 2007) was a member of the former Nepalese royal family. She was the wife of Prince Basundhara of Nepal, a son of King Tribhuvan of Nepal and his second wife, Queen Ishwari.

Life
Princess Helen Shah was born at the Bahadur Bhawan, Kathmandu. She was the younger daughter of General Nara Shamsher Jang Bahadur Rana, KCVO, sometime Inspector-General of the Royal Nepal Police, by his first wife, Uma Rajya Lakshmi, of Doti.

She married Prince Basundhara on June 17, 1945 in Kathmandu.

They had three children:

Princess Jayanti of Nepal (1946–2001), she was killed in the Nepalese royal massacre.
Mrs. Ketaki Chester (born on 14 January 1948 in Kathmandu), she renounced her title on her second marriage to a British airline pilot. 
Princess Jyotshana of Nepal.

Princess Helen Shah was the chairman of Nepal Red Cross Society from 1981 to 1990. From 1977 to 1990, she was a member of Raj Shabha. She worked to promote tourism and raised awareness about women's rights.

On the evening of June 1, 2001, ten members of the Nepalese royal family were murdered, reportedly by the Crown Prince Dipendra. Princess Jayanti, the eldest daughter of Princess Helen, was one of the ten people who died. Princess Helen's second daughter, Ketaki, was also wounded, but survived. During the massacre, Princess Helen Shah was with her sister-in-law, Queen Mother Ratna (the widow of King Mahendra), in the anteroom, and thus the two women survived. They heard the gunshots but did not take them seriously. A few minutes later, Prince Paras came and told the two women what had happened.

Princess Helen Shah established the Jayanti Memorial Trust (JMT) in memory of her eldest daughter Princess Jayanti, who was killed in the royal massacre. The trust works to fight against cardiac diseases. Princess Jayanti had worked hard to help heart patients and making cardiac treatment more affordable and reachable to the common people of Nepal.

Princess Helen owned Hotel de l'Annapurna, one of the five-star hotels in the capital, the travel agency "Yeti Travels" and a resort in Pokhara, Fishtail Lodge, which was frequently targeted by the Maoist guerrillas during the decade-old insurgency.

Princess Helen Shah, the widow of Prince Basundhara, died of cancer on September 12, 2007 at the King Birendra Military Hospital, Chhauni.

Her older sister Princep married Prince Himalaya of Nepal.

Honours

National 
 Member of the Order of Om Rama Patta (23 October 2001).
 Member of the Order of the Three Divine Powers, 1st class.
 Member of the Order of the Gurkha Right Hand, 1st class (24 February 1975).
 King Mahendra Coronation Medal (2 May 1956).
 King Birendra Coronation Medal (24 February 1975).
 Daibi Prakop Piditoddhar Padak [Natural Disaster Management Medal].
 Commemorative Silver Jubilee Medal of King Birendra (31 January 1997).
 King Gyanendra Investiture Medal (4 June 2001).

Foreign 
  : Dame Grand Cordon of the Order of the Precious Crown.

References

Nepalese princesses
Nepalese royalty
1932 births
2007 deaths
Grand Cordons of the Order of the Precious Crown
Members of the Order of Gorkha Dakshina Bahu, First Class
Members of the Order of Tri Shakti Patta, First Class
People from Kathmandu
21st-century Nepalese nobility
20th-century Nepalese nobility
Nepalese Hindus